The Golden House is a 2017 novel by Salman Rushdie. The novel, his eleventh, is set in Mumbai and New York.

Reviews 
Writing for The Guardian, Aminatta Forna said: "Rushdie puts his finger on the nationwide identity crisis in this novel of race, reinvention and the different bubbles of US life." Reviewer Dwight Garner of The New York Times opined: "The Golden House' is a big novel, wide but shallow, so wide it has its own meteorology. The forecast: heavy wind"; while New Statesman reviewer Leo Robson dismissed it as "little more than an exercise in googling, an attempt to sell the listicle as literature."

References 

Novels by Salman Rushdie
2017 British novels
Novels set in New York City
Jonathan Cape books
Novels set in Mumbai